Wilfrid Jackson may refer to:
 J. Wilfrid Jackson, British conchologist, archaeologist and geologist. 
 Sir Wilfrid Edward Francis Jackson, British colonial governor

See also
 Wilfred Jackson, American animator, arranger, composer and director